Roger T. Hughes (born September 16, 1941) is a former Judge of the Federal Court of Canada.

Born in Montreal, Quebec, Roger T. Hughes, Q.C., obtained his LL.B. at the University of Toronto in 1966 and is called to the Bar in both Ontario and Alberta.  Prior to his appointment to the Federal Court of Canada in June 2005, Justice Hughes practised law in Toronto as an Associate and Partner at Sim, Hughes, Ashton & McKay and Sim & McBurney. He served as past President of the Patent and Trademark Institute of Canada and Director of The Advocates' Society, and authors a variety of intellectual property treatises.

External links 
 Roger T. Hughes at the Federal Court of Canada

See also 
Federal Court (Canada)

References 

1941 births
Living people
Anglophone Quebec people
Canadian King's Counsel
Judges of the Federal Court of Canada
People from Montreal